The Battle of Toski (Tushkah) was part of the Mahdist War. It took place on August 3, 1889 in southern Egypt between the Anglo-Egyptian forces and the Mahdist forces of the Sudan.

Since 1882, the British had taken control of Egypt and found themselves involved in the Sudan war. For this reason, they decided to reform and rearm the Egyptian Army. In 1885 a British general, Sir Francis Grenfell was appointed Sirdar (commander-in-chief) and British officers trained and led the newly formed units.

The Sudanese, on the other hand had not renounced their ambition of spreading the Mahdist faith to Egypt. In 1889, the Khalifa Abdallahi ibn Muhammad sent the Emir Wad-el-Nujumi and an army 6,000 strong into Egypt for this purpose. The Mahdists avoided Wadi Halfa where most of the Egyptian troops were garrisoned, and camped at Toski by the Nile, 76 km north of the Egypt–Sudan border. Here they were attacked by the Egyptian Army, who nearly annihilated the Sudanese after a five-hour fight. The Emir was killed trying to rally his men and only 800 Mahdist warriors escaped. Apart from the officers commanding the Egyptian units, the only British troops participating were a squadron of the 20th Hussars.

This battle demonstrated the fighting qualities of the reformed Egyptian Army, including the newly raised Sudanese units that made up four of the six infantry battalions present, and effectively ended the Mahdist threat to Egypt.

References

1889 in Sudan
Battles involving Egypt
Battles of the Mahdist War
Conflicts in 1889
August 1889 events